Aviva Grand Prix  may refer to:

Aviva Indoor Grand Prix, an annual indoor athletics meeting at the National Indoor Arena in Birmingham
Aviva Birmingham Grand Prix, an annual outdoor athletics meeting held at Alexander Stadium
Aviva London Grand Prix, an annual outdoor athletics meeting held at Crystal Palace